Euphorbia apurimacensis is a species of plant in the family Euphorbiaceae. It is endemic to Peru.

References

Endemic flora of Peru
apurimacensis
Vulnerable plants
Taxonomy articles created by Polbot
Taxa named by Léon Croizat